The National Association of Collegiate Esports (NACE) is a North American collegiate esports association founded in 2016. It is a nonprofit membership association organized by and on behalf of its members. With its members they are developing structure and tools needed to advance collegiate esports. Together, laying groundwork in: Eligibility, path to graduation, competition and scholarships.
NACE is the largest member association of varsity esports programs in North America.

Esports
 Counter-Strike: Global Offensive
 Fortnite
 Hearthstone
 League of Legends
 Overwatch 2
 Rocket League
 Valorant
 Call of Duty: Modern Warfare II (2022 video game)
 Call of Duty: Vanguard
 Dota 2
 Rainbow Six: Siege
 Super Smash Bros. Ultimate
 Chess.com

Members
The association had 42 member colleges and universities in spring 2018 and over 200 by late 2022

References

External links

Esports governing bodies
Sports organizations established in 2016
College sports governing bodies in the United States
College esports in the United States